Gakona Landing Strip is an abandoned airfield located near Gakona in the U.S. state of Alaska.

History
The strip was used by the United States Army Air Forces (USAAF) as an emergency landing field for aircraft assigned to Alaska during World War II.  It was closed after the war.

See also

 Alaska World War II Army Airfields

References

External links

Airfields of the United States Army Air Forces in Alaska
Airports in Copper River Census Area, Alaska